Parornix asiatica is a moth of the family Gracillariidae. It is known from Tajikistan and Turkmenistan.

The larvae feed on Rosaceae species. They probably mine the leaves of their host plant.

References

Parornix
Moths of Asia
Moths described in 1991